K130, or similar, may refer to:

K-130 (Kansas highway), a state highway in Kansas
HMS Lotus (K130), a former UK Royal Navy ship
Symphony No. 18 (Mozart) in F major, by Mozart